Haswell Moor is a small village in County Durham, England. It is situated between Haswell and Shotton Colliery.

A wind farm opened at Haswell Moor Farm, just to the north-west of Haswell Moor in 2010; it consists of five wind turbines that are together capable of producing 10MW of electricity.

References

Villages in County Durham